The Wilson House in Alberton, Montana, located at 114 Adams St., was built in 1914.  It was listed on the National Register of Historic Places in 1997.

It is a one-and-a-half-story Craftsman-style house which was first owned by railroad conductor Clarence E. Wilson and his wife Catherine.

References

Houses on the National Register of Historic Places in Montana
Houses completed in 1914
National Register of Historic Places in Mineral County, Montana
American Craftsman architecture in Montana
1914 establishments in Montana